The 141st Massachusetts General Court, consisting of the Massachusetts Senate and the Massachusetts House of Representatives, met in 1920 during the governorship of Calvin Coolidge. Edwin T. McKnight served as president of the Senate and Joseph E. Warner served as speaker of the House.

Senators

Representatives

See also
 1920 Massachusetts gubernatorial election
 66th United States Congress
 List of Massachusetts General Courts

References

Further reading

External links

 
 

Political history of Massachusetts
Massachusetts legislative sessions
massachusetts
1920 in Massachusetts